ACM SIGAI is the Association for Computing Machinery's Special Interest Group on Artificial Intelligence (AI), an interdisciplinary group of academic and industrial researchers, practitioners, software developers, end users, and students who work together to promote and support the growth and application of AI principles and techniques throughout computing.  SIGAI is one of the oldest special interest groups in the ACM. SIGAI, previously called SIGART, started in 1966, publishing the SIGART Newsletter that later became the SIGART Bulletin and Intelligence Magazine.

Conferences
SIGAI supports several conferences.

 The ACM/IEEE International Conference on Human–Robot Interaction (HRI). 
 The IEEE/WIC/ACM International Conference on Web Intelligence (WI). The next conference will be held October 2016 in Omaha, Nebraska.
 The IEEE/WIC/ACM International Joint Conference on Web Intelligence and Intelligent Agent Technology (WI-IAT).
 The International Conference on Automated Software Engineering (ASE). The next conference will be held in September 2016 in Singapore.
 The International Conference on Intelligent User Interfaces (IUI).
 The International Conference on Knowledge Capture (K-CAP).
 The SIGAI Career Network and Conference (SIGAI CNC).

Journal
ACM Transactions on Intelligent Systems and Technology (ACM TIST) is a scholarly journal that publishes the quality papers on intelligent systems, applicable algorithms and technology with a multi-disciplinary perspective. An intelligent system is one that uses AI techniques to offer important services (e.g., as a component of a larger system) to allow integrated systems to perceive, reason, learn, and act intelligently in the real world.

Newsletter/Bulletin
AI Matters is the SIGAI quarterly newsletter featuring ideas and announcements of interest to the AI community. AI Matters is archived and made available in the ACM Digital Library.

Awards
SIGAI has two main awards that are given out annually.

Allen Newell Award
The ACM - AAAI Allen Newell Award was founded in honor of Allen Newell, one of the founders of the field of AI. It is presented to an individual selected for career contributions that have breadth within computer science, or that bridge computer science and other disciplines.

ACM/SIGAI Autonomous Agents Research Award
The ACM/SIGAI Autonomous Agents Research Award recognizes researchers in autonomous agents whose current work is an important influence on the field. The award is an official ACM award, funded by an endowment created by ACM SIGAI from the proceeds of previous Autonomous Agents conferences. Prior to 2014, it was known as the ACM/SIGART Autonomous Agents Award. Winners include the following:

Munindar Singh, 2020
Carles Sierra, 2019
Craig Boutilier, 2018
David Parkes, 2017
Peter Stone, 2016
 Catherine Pelachaud, 2015
 Michael Wellman, 2014
 Jeffrey S. Rosenschein, 2013
 Moshe Tennenholtz, 2012
 Joe Halpern, 2011
 Jonathan Gratch, 2010
 Stacy Marsella, 2010
 Manuela M. Veloso, 2009
 Yoav Shoham, 2008
 Sarit Kraus, 2007
Michael Wooldridge, 2006
 Milind Tambe, 2005
 Makoto Yokoo, 2004
 Nicholas Jennings, 2003
 Katia Sycara, 2002
 Tuomas Sandholm, 2001

SIGAI Advisory Board 
The SIGAI Advisory Board includes:
 Yolanda Gil
 James A. Hendler
 Haym Hirsh
 Eric Horvitz
 Craig A. Knoblock
 Qiang Yang

SIGAI Officers 
SIGAI Elected Officers include:

 Yolanda Gil, Chair
 Sanmay Das, Vice-Chair
 Susan L. Epstein, Secretary-Treasurer
 Maria Gini, Past Chair

SIGAI Appointed Officers include:

 Eric Eaton, Newsletter Editor
 Amy McGovern, Newsletter Co-editor
 Doug Lange, News Officer
 Sven Koenig, Conference Coordination Officer
 Gabor Melli, Publications Officer
 Smiljana Petrovic, Membership and Outreach Officer
 Tom Dietterich, Public Policy Officer
 Mehran Sahami, Education Activities Liaison
 Peter Norvig, Education Activities Liaison
 Allen Lavoie, Information Officer

See also
 Association for Computing Machinery

References

External links
 ACM SIGAI
 ACM Digital Library

Association for Computing Machinery Special Interest Groups